Richard Patrick Tallentyre Gibson, Baron Gibson (5 February 1916 – 20 April 2004) was a British businessman in the publishing industry, and later arts administrator.

Life
Gibson was educated at Eton and Magdalen College, Oxford. He became a stockbroker in 1937, and he joined the Middlesex Yeomanry on the outbreak of the Second World War. He served in North Africa, but was captured at Derna in Libya in April 1941. He was held as a prisoner-of-war at Camp 41 near Parma in northern Italy, where he shared a room with Edward Tomkins and Nigel Strutt, all three becoming firm friends. Strutt was repatriated on medical grounds, and Gibson and Tomkins were moved to another camp. Gibson then served with Special Operations Executive and the Foreign Office.

He married Dione Pearson in 1945, a member of the Pearson PLC dynasty and granddaughter of Weetman Pearson, 1st Viscount Cowdray and of 1st Baron Brabourne. Gibson joined the family's Westminster Press group of regional newspapers in 1947 as a trainee journalist, rapidly rising up through the business, consolidating and expanding its media interests.  He became a director of the Financial Times, The Economist, and of Pearson, and chairman of Pearson Longman in 1967, and of the Financial Times in 1975.  He was chairman of the Pearson group from 1978 to 1983.

He was a member of the Arts Council of Great Britain from 1963, and chair from 1972 to 1977.  During his period as chair, the council was under pressure due to government-wide spending cuts and reduced corporate patronage due to an economic down turn.  Gibson argued against the imposition of admission fees for public museums and galleries (a measure that in the end was only briefly and partially in place) and defended the council's more controversial funding decisions against charges of elitism. From 1977 to 1986, he was Chairman of the National Trust, a position in which he had personal interest as the owner of Penns in the Rocks, a  estate in Sussex previously owned by William Penn that he bought from the estate of Dorothy Wellesley, Duchess of Wellington in 1957.  In this period, the National Trust acquired Fountains Abbey in Yorkshire, Belton House in Lincolnshire, Calke Abbey in Derbyshire, and The Argory in County Armagh.

He was made a life peer in 1975, becoming Baron Gibson, of Penn's Rocks in the County of East Sussex. In addition to his Sussex estate, he owned an 18th-century villa at Asolo, near Venice.

He also served as chairman of the advisory council of the Victoria and Albert Museum, a director of the Royal Opera House, a trustee of Glyndebourne, a member of the National Art Collections Fund committee, treasurer of the Historic Churches Preservation Trust, and advised the Gulbenkian Foundation.

He was survived by his wife and their four sons. Lady Gibson died in 2012.

References

External links
Obituary, The Daily Telegraph, 20 April 2004

1916 births
2004 deaths
Gibson
Alumni of Magdalen College, Oxford
British Army personnel of World War II
British publishers (people)
British arts administrators
British stockbrokers
People educated at Eton College
World War II prisoners of war held by Italy
British Special Operations Executive personnel
Middlesex Yeomanry officers
Life peers created by Elizabeth II